Xīncāng (新仓) could refer to:

 Xincang, Taihu County, town in southwestern Anhui, China
 Xincang, Pinghu, town in Pinghu, Zhejiang, China